Miklós Cirjenics (born 11 March 1990) is a Hungarian judoka. He represented his country at the 2016 Summer Olympics.

References

External links
 
 

1990 births
Living people
Hungarian male judoka
Judoka at the 2016 Summer Olympics
Olympic judoka of Hungary
European Games competitors for Hungary
Judoka at the 2015 European Games
Judoka at the 2019 European Games
Judoka at the 2020 Summer Olympics
Sportspeople from Pécs
20th-century Hungarian people
21st-century Hungarian people